Snapdragon (Lorna Leigh Raeburn) is a fictional character, a superhero of Marvel Comics, member of the Strikeforce: Morituri. The character was created by Peter B. Gillis and Brent Anderson.

Publication history
Snapdragon (Lorna Leigh Raeburn) was created by writer Peter B. Gillis and artist Brent Anderson and debuted in Strikeforce: Morituri #1 (December 1986). The codename "Snapdragon" was introduced in issue #2. Snapdragon remained a regular character until her death in issue #4. She was the first regular character to die in the series, opening a long string of deaths.

Fictional character biography
Nothing is known of Lorna Leigh Raeburn's life prior to her joining Strikeforce: Morituri. A sassy, confident young woman, at some point, in 2073, she volunteered for the Morituri program, a program which could confer superhuman abilities to ordinary people, to be used in the ongoing war of Earth against the evil alien race known as the Horde. However, the powers came at a terrible price: the recipients invariably died within a year of taking the process, their powers flaring up and their bodies rejecting their newly inserted metabolism with fatal results.

Undaunted, Lorna applied for the process and was found genetically compatible to undertake it, one in only six among thousands of applicants. As such, Lorna was subjected to the process, becoming part of the first official generation of Strikeforce: Morituri.

Later, the team members were sent to the Garden (the nickname of Biowar Zone Alpha), a booby-trapped artificial environment, whose objective was to help the heroes manifest their superhuman powers by exposing them to extreme danger and stress. Lorna was the only one of her teammates who was not threatened by any of the myriad traps of the Garden. Instead, her powers surfaced when her panicked teammate, Vyking, snapped out and accused their Commander, Beth Nion, of trying to kill them, seeing how she had not aborted the test sequence, despite the other members of the team almost dying in the process. Enraged at his accusations against their Commander, Lorna slapped him, simultaneously releasing her plasma burst for the first time, as a result of her extreme anger. After the team members all succeeded in the Garden trial, Lorna assumed the codename "Snapdragon" and incorporated wrist mounted projectors in her costume, which could help her focus her bursts more effectively.

In the next few weeks, Snapdragon and Vyking becoming getting closer to each other, although they never spelled out explicitly any feelings. In the first official mission of the team, in Kramatorsk, Soviet Union, Snapdragon proved exceptionally effective when her teammate, Radian used his E-M radiation emissions to help propel her plasma bursts.

Death
Sometime later, the team was invited to a party in New York City, where they met the actors who would portray them in an upcoming soap opera. The party was interrupted by the intrusion of some Hordian soldiers. During the battle, Snapdragon began experiencing an exhilarating surge of power, the first indication of the deadly Morituri effect catching up. After the battle was over, Snapdragon realized her time was up. Horrified, she ran to get a safe distance from those nearby before vaporizing, her death recorded by countless cameras. She was the first member of her generation of Morituri to die.

Powers and abilities
Snapdragon had the ability to generate plasma bursts, which she focused through the wrist mounted projectors she wore. As a result of her exposure to the Morituri process, she also possessed enhanced strength and agility.

References

Comics characters introduced in 1986
Marvel Comics characters with superhuman strength
Marvel Comics female superheroes
Marvel Comics superheroes
Strikeforce: Morituri